Lang Michener LLP was a Canadian full-service national law firm, once employing over 200 lawyers with offices in Toronto, Vancouver, Ottawa, and Hong Kong. On January 1, 2011, Lang Michener and McMillan LLP combined, taking the name McMillan LLP.

History
Lang Michener dated back to 1926 in Toronto, Ontario, where future Governor General Roland Michener and Daniel Lang formed the firm as Lang & Michener.  That same year, in Vancouver, British Columbia, the firm of Lawrence & Shaw was formed by partners James Lyle Lawrence and Alistair Shaw.  The two firms merged in 1989 to become Lang Michener Lawrence & Shaw.  The firm was later renamed Lang Michener LLP.

The first Lang & Michener office was in the Canadian National Building at 347 Bay Street. It was one of the first Bay Street law firms in Canada.

The firm played a leading role in Canada's political and legal landscape.  Founding partner Roland Michener was appointed Speaker of the House of Commons by Prime Minister John Diefenbaker and later Governor General of Canada by Prime Minister Lester B. Pearson.  Daniel Aiken Lang, son of firm founder Daniel Webster Lang, was appointed to the Canadian Senate also by Prime Minister Lester B. Pearson.  The Right Honourable Jean Chrétien practiced with Lang Michener from 1986 to 1990, and Michel Bastarache, of the Ottawa office, was appointed a Justice of the Supreme Court of Canada in 1997.

In later years, the firm's reputation as a leading Bay Street law firm had faded. In 2010, the firm ranked as the 22nd largest law firm in the country. The firm elected to merge with McMillan LLP in November 2010. Observers saw the merger as a sign of the difficult legal economy and an opportunity for the two firms to regain their lost clout. After the merger, the new McMillan became the 12th largest firm in Canada.

References

Defunct law firms of Canada
Companies based in Toronto
Law firms established in 1926
1926 establishments in Ontario
Law firms disestablished in 2011
Canadian companies established in 1926
Canadian companies disestablished in 2011

no:Lang